Daniel Gramann (born 6 January 1987) is an Austrian football defender.

Biography 
Gramann was born in Vienna, and is the son of former federal league player and ex-ÖFB Secretary General Wolfgang Gramann.

Club career 

Gramann began his career at VfB Admira Wacker Mödling, spending two years at the Mödling based club and playing in only a handful of games before moving on to TSV Hartberg. A year later, Gramann transferred to SC Rheindorf Altach. In 2009, Gramann was again on the move, this time to Austrian Bundesliga side SK Austria Kärnten where he stayed until June 2010 when the club went defunct.

International career 

In 2007, Gramann played for Austria in the FIFA Under 20 World Cup, making it to the semi finals before being eliminated by Czech Republic. They were defeated in the third place playoff by Chile.

References

1987 births
Living people
Austrian footballers
Austria youth international footballers
Austrian Football Bundesliga players
FC Admira Wacker Mödling players
SC Rheindorf Altach players
SK Austria Kärnten players
TSV Hartberg players
Association football defenders
Footballers from Vienna